Carmen is a 2021 drama film written and directed by Valerie Buhagiar. Inspired in part by the real experiences of Buhagiar's own aunt Rita, the film stars Natascha McElhone as Carmen, a Maltese spinster who has spent her adult life serving as a caretaker for her brother, who is a Roman Catholic priest, but who finds herself feeling free to explore her own desires and goals in life as she nears age 50. The cast also includes Steven Love, Michaela Farrugia, Peter Galea, Mikhail Basmadjian, Henry Zammit Cordina, and Richard Clarkin.

Shot in Malta in 2019, the film was screened for distributors in the Industry Selects program at the 2021 Toronto International Film Festival, but was not made available to the general public. It had its public premiere at the 2021 Whistler Film Festival, where Diego Guijarro won the award for Best Cinematography in a Borsos Competition film. In 2022, it was screened at the Canadian Film Festival in Toronto, where it won the award for Best Film. The film was released by Vortex Media in Canada in select theatres on August 19, 2022, and on video on demand on September 23, 2022. In Malta, it was released theatrically on September 21, 2022. In the United States, it was released theatrically in major cities and on video on demand on September 23, 2022, by Good Deed Entertainment.

Reception
Metacritic, which uses a weighted average, assigned the film a score of 66 out of 100, based on 5 critics, indicating "generally favorable reviews".

References

External links
 

2021 films
2021 drama films
2021 multilingual films
2020s Canadian films
2020s English-language films
Canadian drama films
Canadian multilingual films
English-language Canadian films
Films set in the 1980s
Films set in Malta
Films shot in Malta
Maltese drama films
Maltese-language films